Hörður Felixson  (born ) is an Icelandic former footballer. He was part of the Iceland national football team between 1958 and 1963. He played 11 matches.

See also
 List of Iceland international footballers

References

External links 
 
 
 Hörður Felixson Profile and Statistics
 Ron Yeats' reunion with Liverpool's first Euro opponents

Living people
Hordur Felixson
1931 births
Hordur Felixson
Hordur Felixson
Place of birth missing (living people)
Association football defenders
Hordur Felixson